The following outline is provided as an overview of and topical guide to Hungary:

Hungary – landlocked sovereign country located in the Carpathian Basin of Central Europe, bordering Austria, Slovakia, Ukraine, Romania, Serbia, Croatia, and Slovenia.  Its capital is Budapest.  Hungary is a member of OECD, NATO, EU and a Schengen state. The official language is Hungarian (also known as Magyar), which forms part of the Uralic family. It is one of the four official languages of the European Union that is not of Indo-European origin.

Following a Celtic (after c. 450 BC) and a Roman (9 BC - c. 4th century) period, the foundation of Hungary was laid in the late Ninth Century by the Magyar chieftain Árpád, whose great grandson István ascended to the throne with a crown sent from Rome in 1000. The Kingdom of Hungary existed with minor interruptions for more than 900 years, and at various points was regarded as one of the cultural centers of the Western world. It was succeeded by a Communist era (1947–1989) during which Hungary gained widespread international attention regarding the Revolution of 1956 and the seminal move of opening its border with Austria in 1989, thus accelerating the collapse of the Eastern Bloc. The present form of government is a parliamentary republic (since 1989). Hungary's current goal is to become a developed country by International Monetary Fund standards, having become already developed by most traditional measures, including GDP and HDI (world ranking 36th and rising). The country's first ever term of EU presidency is due in 2011.

Hungary was one of the 15 most popular tourist destinations in the world in the past decade, with a capital regarded as one of the most beautiful in the world. Despite its relatively small size, the country is home to numerous
World Heritage Sites, UNESCO Biosphere reserves, the second largest thermal lake in the world (Lake Hévíz), the largest lake in Central Europe (Lake Balaton), and the largest natural grassland in Europe (Hortobágy National Park).

General reference

 Pronunciation: 
 Common English country name:  Hungary
 Official English country name: Hungary
 Common endonym: Magyarország
 Official endonym: Magyarország
 Adjectives & demonymic:  Hungarian, Magyar
 Etymology: Name of Hungary
 International rankings of Hungary
 ISO country codes:  HU, HUN, 348
 ISO region codes:  See ISO 3166-2:HU
 Internet country code top-level domain:  .hu

Geography of Hungary 

Geography of Hungary
 Hungary is: a landlocked country
 Location:
 Northern Hemisphere and Eastern Hemisphere
 Eurasia
 Europe
 Central Europe
 Eastern Europe
 Time zone:  Central European Time (UTC+01), Central European Summer Time (UTC+02)
 Extreme points of Hungary
 High:  Kékes 
 Low:  Tisza (south of Szeged) 
 Land boundaries:  2,185 km
 676 km
 443 km
 366 km
 329 km
 166 km
 103 km
 102 km
 Coastline:  none
 Population of Hungary: 10,035,000 (June 30, 2008)  - 80th most populous country

 Area of Hungary: 93,030 km2
 Atlas of Hungary

Environment of Hungary 

 Climate of Hungary
 Renewable energy in Hungary
 Geology of Hungary
 Protected areas of Hungary
 Biosphere reserves in Hungary
 National parks of Hungary
 Wildlife of Hungary
 Fauna of Hungary
 Birds of Hungary
 Mammals of Hungary

Natural geographic features of Hungary 
 Glaciers of Hungary
 Islands of Hungary
 Lakes of Hungary
 Mountains of Hungary
 Volcanoes in Hungary
 Rivers of Hungary
 Waterfalls of Hungary
 Valleys of Hungary
 World Heritage Sites in Hungary

Regions of Hungary

Ecoregions of Hungary 

List of ecoregions in Hungary

Administrative divisions of Hungary 

 Counties of Hungary
 Subregions of Hungary
 Municipalities of Hungary

Counties of Hungary 

Counties of Hungary

Subregions of Hungary 

Subregions of Hungary

Municipalities of Hungary 

Municipalities of Hungary
 Capital of Hungary: Budapest
 Cities of Hungary

Demography of Hungary 

Demographics of Hungary

Government and politics of Hungary 

Politics of Hungary
 Form of government: parliamentary representative democratic republic
 Capital of Hungary: Budapest
 Elections in Hungary

 Political parties in Hungary

Branches of the government of Hungary 

Government of Hungary

Executive branch of the government of Hungary 
 Head of state: President of Hungary, János Áder
 Head of government: Prime Minister of Hungary, Viktor Orbán
 Cabinet of Hungary

Legislative branch of the government of Hungary 

 National Assembly of Hungary (unicameral)

Judicial branch of the government of Hungary 

Court system of Hungary
 Supreme Court of Hungary
 Constitutional Court of Hungary

Foreign relations of Hungary 

Foreign relations of Hungary
 Diplomatic missions of Hungary

International organization membership 

International organization membership of Hungary
The Republic of Hungary is a member of:

Australia Group
Bank for International Settlements (BIS)
Central European Initiative (CEI)
Confederation of European Paper Industries (CEPI)
Council of Europe (CE)
Euro-Atlantic Partnership Council (EAPC)
European Bank for Reconstruction and Development (EBRD)
European Investment Bank (EIB)
European Organization for Nuclear Research (CERN)
European Space Agency (ESA) (cooperating state)
European Union (EU)
Food and Agriculture Organization (FAO)
Group of 9 (G9)
International Atomic Energy Agency (IAEA)
International Bank for Reconstruction and Development (IBRD)
International Chamber of Commerce (ICC)
International Civil Aviation Organization (ICAO)
International Criminal Court (ICCt)
International Criminal Police Organization (Interpol)
International Development Association (IDA)
International Energy Agency (IEA)
International Federation of Red Cross and Red Crescent Societies (IFRCS)
International Finance Corporation (IFC)
International Labour Organization (ILO)
International Maritime Organization (IMO)
International Mobile Satellite Organization (IMSO)
International Monetary Fund (IMF)
International Olympic Committee (IOC)
International Organization for Migration (IOM)
International Organization for Standardization (ISO)
International Red Cross and Red Crescent Movement (ICRM)
International Telecommunication Union (ITU)
International Telecommunications Satellite Organization (ITSO)
International Trade Union Confederation (ITUC)
Inter-Parliamentary Union (IPU)

Multilateral Investment Guarantee Agency (MIGA)
Nonaligned Movement (NAM) (guest)
North Atlantic Treaty Organization (NATO)
Nuclear Energy Agency (NEA)
Nuclear Suppliers Group (NSG)
Organisation internationale de la Francophonie (OIF) (observer)
Organisation for Economic Co-operation and Development (OECD)
Organization for Security and Cooperation in Europe (OSCE)
Organisation for the Prohibition of Chemical Weapons (OPCW)
Organization of American States (OAS) (observer)
Permanent Court of Arbitration (PCA)
Schengen Convention
Southeast European Cooperative Initiative (SECI)
United Nations (UN)
United Nations Conference on Trade and Development (UNCTAD)
United Nations Educational, Scientific, and Cultural Organization (UNESCO)
United Nations High Commissioner for Refugees (UNHCR)
United Nations Industrial Development Organization (UNIDO)
United Nations Interim Force in Lebanon (UNIFIL)
United Nations Mission for the Referendum in Western Sahara (MINURSO)
United Nations Observer Mission in Georgia (UNOMIG)
United Nations Peacekeeping Force in Cyprus (UNFICYP)
Universal Postal Union (UPU)
Western European Union (WEU) (associate)
World Confederation of Labour (WCL)
World Customs Organization (WCO)
World Federation of Trade Unions (WFTU)
World Health Organization (WHO)
World Intellectual Property Organization (WIPO)
World Meteorological Organization (WMO)
World Tourism Organization (UNWTO)
World Trade Organization (WTO)
Zangger Committee (ZC)

Law and order in Hungary 

Law of Hungary

 Capital punishment in Hungary
 Constitution of Hungary
 Crime in Hungary
 Prostitution in Hungary
 Human rights in Hungary
 Women's rights in Hungary
 LGBT rights in Hungary
 Recognition of same-sex unions in Hungary
 Freedom of religion in Hungary
 Law enforcement in Hungary
 2006 protests in Hungary

Military of Hungary 

Military of Hungary
 Command
 Commander-in-chief: President of Hungary
 Ministry of Defence of Hungary
 Minister of Defence of Hungary
 Forces
 Army of Hungary
 Navy of Hungary: None (the country is landlocked)
 Air Force of Hungary
 Military history of Hungary
 Military ranks of Hungary

Local government in Hungary

History of Hungary 

History of Hungary
Timeline of the history of Hungary
Current events of Hungary
 Military history of Hungary

Culture of Hungary 

Culture of Hungary
 Architecture of Hungary
 Cuisine of Hungary
 Festivals in Hungary
 Languages of Hungary
 Media in Hungary
 Museums in Hungary
 National symbols of Hungary
 Coat of arms of Hungary
 Flag of Hungary
 National anthem of Hungary
 People of Hungary
 Prostitution in Hungary
 Public holidays in Hungary
 Records of Hungary
 Religion in Hungary
 Christianity in Hungary
 Hinduism in Hungary
 Islam in Hungary
 History of the Jews in Hungary
 Sikhism in Hungary
 World Heritage Sites in Hungary

Art in Hungary 
 Art in Hungary
 Architecture of Hungary
 Cinema of Hungary
 Literature of Hungary
 Music of Hungary
 Television in Hungary
 Theatre in Hungary

Sports in Hungary 

Sports in Hungary
 Football in Hungary
 Hungary at the Olympics

Economy and infrastructure of Hungary 

Economy of Hungary
 Economic rank, by nominal GDP (2007): 49th (forty-ninth)
 Agriculture in Hungary
 Banking in Hungary
 National Bank of Hungary
 Communications in Hungary
 Internet in Hungary
 Companies of Hungary
Currency of Hungary: Forint
ISO 4217: HUF
 Energy in Hungary
 Energy policy of Hungary
 Oil industry in Hungary
 Health care in Hungary
 Mining in Hungary
 Hungary Stock Exchange
 Tourism in Hungary
 Transport in Hungary
 Airports in Hungary
 Rail transport in Hungary
 Roads in Hungary

Education in Hungary 

Education in Hungary
 List of schools in Hungary

See also 

Hungary
Index of Hungary-related articles
List of Hungary-related topics
List of international rankings
Member state of the European Union
Member state of the North Atlantic Treaty Organization
Member state of the United Nations
Outline of Europe
Outline of geography

References

External links

Official site of the National Assembly
hungary.hu
History of Hungary: Primary Documents
History of Hungary – The Corvinus Library
The Jewish Community of Budapest, Hungary – The Museum of the Jewish People at Beit Hatfutsot
Translation of Hungarian literary works - a database

Agricultural land use profile

Hungary